Malegaon is a city and a municipal corporation in Nashik District in the Indian state of Maharashtra. It is situated on the bank of Mosam River.

History
Malegaon (previously Maligaon) at the confluence of the Mosam (previously Moosy) and Girna rivers.
On the road linking Mumbai and Agra – now National Highway-3(NH3), it used to be a small junction known as Maliwadi (hamlet of gardeners).

Geography

It is 280 km northeast of the state capital Mumbai. It has good connectivity with nearby cities like Nashik, Manmad, Mumbai and Dhule.

Roads:
 State Highway 10 (Maharashtra)
 National Highway 3 (India, old numbering) (Asian Highway no. 10) (Mumbai - Agra)

Climate

Economy
Villages near Malegaon and towards Satana, Nampur, Sonaj, Talwade and Vadel are agricultural areas and major producers of onions. Pomegranate is another crop of commercial importance that is cultivated by farmers in nearby pockets. Krishi Vigyan Kendra (KVK) of Malegaon has a front office at Malegaon and a research farm at Vadel. There is also a campus of Mahatma Gandhi Vidyamandir's H. H. Sri Sri Murlidhara Swamiji College of Agriculture and H. H. Sri Sri Murlidhara Swamiji College of Horticulture in the Malegaon Camp area. There is also a cloth manufacturing industry.

Demographics

 India census, Malegaon city had urban/metropolitan population of 481,228. Males constitute 51% of the population and females 49%. Malegaon has an average literacy rate of 70.54%: Male literacy is 74.25% and female literacy is 66.63%. About 15.41% of the population is under 6 years of age.

In Malegaon City Islam is the most popular religion with approximately 379,927 (78.95%) following it. 89,011 (18.50%) of the population following Hindu religion. Buddhism is followed by 6,830 (1.42%) and Jainism 3,933 (0.82).

78.23% of the population spoke Urdu, 16.76% Marathi, 1.77% Hindi and 1.03% Khandeshi as their first language.

Education

 The Malegaon High School and Junior College
 LVH Academy
 Mansoora College

Covid-19 Malegaon Model 
A Study by panel of doctors appointed by government was conducted to unearth the reasons behind super covid control in Malegaon. News agencies captured the phenomenon.

 Indian Express 
 Times of India

Bomb blast

On 29 September 2008, three bombs exploded in the States of Gujarat and Maharashtra killing eight people and injuring 80. Three of the arrested suspects were identified as Sadhvi Pragya Singh Thakur, Shiv Narayan Gopal Singh Kalsanghra, and Shyam Bhawarlal Sahu. All three were produced before the Chief Judicial Magistrate's court in Nashik, which remanded them to custody till 3 November. On 28 October, the Shiv Sena, came out in support of the accused saying that the arrests were political in nature. , Shiv Sena chief, Uddhav Thackeray, propounded a potential conflict of interest in political rivalry as the Nationalist Congress Party (NCP) controlled the relevant ministry. The National Investigation Agency (NIA) has found evidence against Sadhvi Pragya Singh Thakur and it has recommended the court to act against all charges against her which was proven incorrect.

The Indian Army officer Prasad Shrikant Purohit was also accused of being involved in the blast.

MLAs

MLAs from Malegaon Constituency for Maharashtra Assembly:
1930: Gulab Miya Wasif ,  Indian National Congress [First MLA Before Independence]
 1952: Mohammad Sabir Abdul Sattar, Indian National Congress (First MLA after independence)
 1962: Haroon Ansari, Indian National Congress
 1967: Nihal Ahmed Maulavi Mohammed Usman, Praja socialist
 1972: Aysha Hakeem Saheba, Indian National Congress
 1978: Nihal Ahmed Maulavi Mohammed Usman, Janata Party
 1980: Nihal Ahmed Maulavi Mohammed Usman, Janata Party
 1985: Nihal Ahmed Maulavi Mohammed Usman, Janata Party
 1990: Nihal Ahmed Maulavi Mohammed Usman, Janata Dal(S)
 1995: Nihal Ahmed Maulavi Mohammed Usman, Janata Dal(S)
 1999: Shaikh Rashid Haji Shaikh Shaffi, Indian National Congress
 2004: Shaikh Rashid Haji Shaikh Shaffi, Indian National Congress
 2009: Mufti Mohammad Ismail, Jan Surajya Shakti
 2014: Shaikh Aasif Shaikh Rashid, Indian National Congress
 2019: Mufti Mohammad Ismail, 
All India Majlis Ittehadul Muslimeen

MLAs from Malegaon Outer Constituency for Maharashtra Assembly:

 1978: Hiray Baliram Waman, INDIAN NATIONAL CONGRESS
 1980: Hiray Baliram Waman, INDIAN NATIONAL CONGRESS
 1985: Hiray Pushpatai Vyankatrao, INDIAN CONGRESS (SOCIALIST) 
 1990: Hiray Pushpatai Vyankatrao, Indian National Congress
 1995: Hiray Pushpatai Vyankatrao, Indian National Congress
 1999: Hire Prashant Venkatrao, Nationalist Congress Party
 2004: Dadaji Bhuse, Independent
 2009: Dadaji Bhuse, Shiv Sena
 2014: Dadaji Bhuse, Shiv Sena
 2019: Dadaji Bhuse, Shiv Sena

References

External links

Indian Express article: A Town Called Malegaon
Gazetteer Nasik

 
Cities and towns in Nashik district
Talukas in Maharashtra
Textile industry in Maharashtra
Cities in Maharashtra